Graham Edwards (born 19 September 1970) is a former Zimbabwean cricketer. He was a right-handed batsman and right-arm medium-pace bowler who played for Matabeleland. He was born in Bulawayo.

Edwards made a single first-class appearance for the team, during the 1994/95 Logan Cup competition, against Mashonaland Under-25s. Batting in the lower order, Edwards scored 20 runs in the first innings and 32 in the second innings of the match, 32 being the highest individual score of the second innings.

External links
Graham Edwards at Cricket Archive 

1970 births
Living people
Cricketers from Bulawayo
Zimbabwean cricketers
Matabeleland cricketers